Magnus Cathedral is a ruined cathedral in the village of Kirkjubøur on the island of Streymoy in the Faroe Islands. The ruins are the largest medieval building in the Faroe Islands.

History
Bishop Erlendur (1269–1308)  started construction in about the year 1300. Earlier it was believed that the structure was never completed, however recent research suggests otherwise. The finding of an arch roof base and of old plastering on the walls indicate that the structure was actually roofed and in use at some point. Also the size of the famous pew ends from the nearby Saint Olav's Church indicates that they were originally made for and placed inside the roofed cathedral. However it did not have a long lifetime, because after the Reformation in 1537, the Diocese of the Faroe Islands was abolished and supposedly the cathedral was left to decay.

The only known relic of St. Thorlak of Iceland is contained with other saints' relics in a lead box in the sanctuary's end wall ("The Golden Locker").

Conservation work 

Conservation work on the Cathedral started in 1997, as it became clear that the ruin was deteriorating at a rapid pace, with more and more mortar falling away due to the elements, mostly from rain, but also salty sea air and sea water. During 2002-2004, a wooden shed was erected around most of the ruin, giving it enough shelter to dry out, before work could begin on preservation. The shed drew considerable criticism because of its looks.

During the research into how to preserve the ruin, a conclusion was reached. No outward reconstruction would be made, and instead ongoing preservation work would be implemented, where the mortar would be reinforced from time to time. In addition, all horizontal surfaces, where water could seep in, would be "soft capped" with mortar and clay before being topped with sod and grass. This work began in 2010.

Today considerable headway has been made. Large sections of the shedding have been removed and work is expected to be finished in the not too distant future. While it is hoped that Magnus Cathedral will be accepted as a UNESCO World heritage Site, the prospect is not very certain.

Gallery
Pictures of the ruins of Magnus Cathedral were featured on a series of Faroese stamps in 1988:

References

Related reading
Hans Jacob Debes (1990) Føroya søga, Volum 2 (Tórshavn: Føroya Skúlabókagrunnar) 

Roman Catholic churches in the Faroe Islands
Roman Catholic cathedrals in Europe
Churches in Tórshavn